Martin Hole (born 28 July 1959) is a Norwegian cross-country skier. He was born in Geilo, and represented the club Geilo IL. He competed at the 1988 Winter Olympics in Calgary.
He also won two Norwegian championships; 15 km in 1985 and 30 km in 1986.

Cross-country skiing results
All results are sourced from the International Ski Federation (FIS).

Olympic Games

World Championships

World Cup

Season standings

Individual podiums
 1 podium

Team podiums
 2 podiums

References

External links

1959 births
Living people
People from Hol
Norwegian male cross-country skiers
Olympic cross-country skiers of Norway
Cross-country skiers at the 1988 Winter Olympics
Sportspeople from Viken (county)